Sibusiso Mandlenkosi Emmanuel Bengu (b 8 May 1934) is a South African retired politician. 

Bengu was born in Kranskop, Natal and become a teacher in 1952. Sibusiso founded the Dlangezwa High School near Empangeni in 1969 and was principal until 1976. He completed a PhD in political sciences at the Graduate Institute of International Studies in Geneva in 1974 and in 1977 he was appointed a professor at the University of Zululand. He served as Secretary-General of Inkatha Freedom Party but due to differences he clashed with Mangosuthu Buthelezi.

Sibusiso left South Africa in 1978 and served as secretary for research and social action for the Lutheran World Foundation. While he was abroad he met and became friends with Oliver Tambo, then acting President of the African National Congress. He returned in 1991 to become the first black Vice-chancellor of a South African university, Fort Hare University. Sibusiso became Minister of Education in 1994, and served until he was deployed to Germany to become South Africa's ambassador in 1999.

He is married to Funeka and has four daughters and one son.

References

External links 

 Who's who

1934 births
Living people
People from Umvoti Local Municipality
Zulu people
Inkatha Freedom Party politicians
Education ministers of South Africa
Ambassadors of South Africa to Germany
Graduate Institute of International and Development Studies alumni